Cosmic Dancer is a sculpture by Swiss-American artist Arthur Woods that travelled to the Russian Mir space station in May 1993.

See also
 Space art

References

External links
Cosmic Dancer - a space art intervention by Arthur Woods

Mir
1993 sculptures
Dance in art